Nell Marmalade Baxendale-Williams (born 13 September 1998), known as Nell Williams, is an English actress. In 2015 she portrayed a teen version of Cersei Lannister (portrayed by Lena Headey as an adult) in flashback sequences of the opening episode of Season 5 of the HBO series Game of Thrones. She has also appeared in The Revolting World of Stanley Brown, Loving Miss Hatto, and Grantchester. Williams appeared as Vivian Daniels in the 2016 film London Town, which premiered at the Los Angeles Film Festival. She also appeared in the 2019 films Blinded by the Light and The Good Liar.

Biography 
She was born Nell Marmalade Baxendale-Williams 13 September 1998 in Hackney, London, England. She is first child of British-American film director David L. Williams and the English actress Helen Baxendale. She has two brothers Eric William (born in 2001) and Vincent Elliot Williams (born in 2006).

Filmography

Television

Film

Theatre 
 Love and Information, Royal Court Theatre, London, 2012

References

External links
 

English child actresses
Living people
21st-century English actresses
Place of birth missing (living people)
1998 births
English television actresses